En Garde, Society! is the second album by American stand-up comedian Eugene Mirman. The album was released on May 9, 2006 by Sub Pop.

Track listing
 Ever Get Drunk and...?, Edinburgh 3:20	
 Joking and Lying, Jack in the Box, Extreme Bowling 3:18	
 Truth or Dare, Dogs, Tube Steak Sex Guys 1:47
 Leaning in Chelsea, Born Gay, Gay Brother, Sneezing 1:47
 Movie, Deep Fried Stuffed Cheeseburger, What Kind of Animal?, Red Tide, Abortion 2:32	
 The Right Stuff 3:24
 Girlfriend, American Airlines, Scientists 1:55
 Grandmother 0:46
 Revolve (The Complete New Testament in the Form of a Teen Magazine) 5:23
 Swearing in Russian, Immigrating 1:18
 Letters to Nouns 3:21
 Horses Talking, Bathroom Door 1:04
 Coupons for the Audience 4:54	
 Driving and Thinking 3:47
 The Goodnight Song 6:32

2006 albums
Eugene Mirman albums
Sub Pop albums
2000s comedy albums